The Pearl River is an extensive river system in southern China. 

Pearl River may also refer to:
Pearl River (Mississippi–Louisiana), in the United States
 Pearl River, an older name for Pearl Harbor in O'ahu, Hawai'i

Communities and administrative divisions
In the United States:
Pearl River, Louisiana
Pearl River, Mississippi
Pearl River, New York
Pearl River County, Mississippi
Pearl River County School District

In music
Pearl River Piano Group, the largest piano factory in the world
Pearl River (band), a country music band
Pearl River (album), the above band's second album

Other 
 Pearl Rivers — the nom de plume of Eliza Jane Poitevent Holbrook Nicholson
 Pearl River (Metro-North station), New York train station
Pearl River Mart, New York City retail store
 Pearl River Resort, Mississippi casino resort
 Pearl River Community College, Mississippi community college
 Pearl River Tower, business tower

See also

Pearl River High School (disambiguation)
Pearl River map turtle
Battle of the Pearl River Forts